Archangel is the tenth studio album by American heavy metal band Soulfly.  It was released on August 14, 2015, through Nuclear Blast Entertainment. It is the band's shortest album to date, running thirty-six and a half minutes.  It is the band's last album to feature bassist Tony Campos, who left the band shortly after recording to join Fear Factory. With a peak position of number 130 on the Billboard 200, it is Soulfly's second-lowest charting album to date (behind 2005's Dark Ages, which peaked at number 155). The statistic is common with the decreasing number of album sales worldwide in all genres of music, as digital releases have taken over the market. 
The ensuing "We Sold Our Souls To Metal" Tour to promote Archangel's release featured Soulfly playing as many as 7 songs from the album live each night, which is the first time since the Primitive Tour that the band has played the majority of a new album live.

Track listing

Reception 
Andrew "Schizodeluxe" Massie of The Rockpit reviewed that the album is "a somewhat diverse record with the death metal inspired tracks, the groove mid-tempo stuff and the thrashier songs mixed in there. Archangel is both streamlined and very aggressive." Riley Rowe of Metal Injection wrote that "Archangel, an apt title to indicate Soulfly's spreading of wings towards a more mature style, is the grand and fitting next step in their mystical, musical journey." Ray Van Horn Jr. of Blabbermouth reviewed that "Archangel is the most daring and freshest Soulfly album since Prophecy, but there's something slightly remiss and somewhat disjointed in this leaner yet embroidered shift toward yet another new order in this band." Elpida Baphomet of Metal Invader reviewed that "Archangel is characterized by its sophisticated oriental compositions, powerful grooves, multifaceted choirs and religious orientations. All of the instruments and voices stand out in the best possible way." Steve of Metal Blast! reviewed that the album starts out with a bang showcasing expert performances and then the entertainment fizzles out in the album's second half.

Personnel 

Soulfly
Max Cavalera - vocals, 4-string guitar, sitar on "Soulfly X"
Marc Rizzo - lead guitar, flamenco guitar on "Soulfly X"
Tony Campos - bass, vocals on "Acosador Nocturno", acoustic bass on "Soulfly X"
Zyon Cavalera - drums, percussion

Additional musicians
Todd Jones - vocals on "Sodomites"
Matt Young - vocals on "Live Life Hard!"
Richie Cavalera - vocals on "Mother of Dragons"
Igor Cavalera Jr - vocals and bass on "Mother of Dragons"
Anahid M.O.P. - vocals on "Mother of Dragons"
Roki Cavalera - intro on "You Suffer"
Roman Babakhanyan - duduk on "Soulfly X"

Production
Matt Hyde - production, recording, mixing, mastering, interludes
Chris Rakestraw - engineering
Rem Massingill - assistant
Allen Steelgrave - assistant
Jon Nicholson - drum tech
Samuel Petit - direction (DVD), editing (DVD)
Fred Ricci - editing (DVD)
Benoit Gilg - audio mixing (DVD)
Patrick Villeneuve - production (DVD)
Eric Hallier - production (DVD)
Sombrero & Co - production (DVD)

Artwork
Eliran Kantor - album cover art
Leo Zulueta - logo
Hannah Verbeuren - photography
Marcelo Vasco - design
Maicon Ristow - illustration

Charts

References

2015 albums
Soulfly albums
Nuclear Blast albums
Albums produced by Matt Hyde
Albums with cover art by Eliran Kantor